Dizoniopsis herosae is a species of sea snail, a gastropod in the family Cerithiopsidae, which is known from the Caribbean Sea and the Gulf of Mexico. It was described by Jay and Drivas, in 2002.

References

Cerithiopsidae
Gastropods described in 2002